Dick Elliott was a Democratic member of the South Carolina Senate, representing the 28th District since 1992. He was previously a member of the South Carolina House of Representatives from 1982 through 1992. He went to Wingate Junior College, now Wingate University, and to Clemson University. Elliott was a real estate developer. In 1959, he founded Elliott Realty, a real estate company. In 1971, he developed Eagle Nest Golf Course. He served on the Horry County, South Carolina Council and the North Myrtle Beach, South Carolina City Council.

References

External links
Follow the Money - Dick Elliott
2006 2004 2002 2000 1998 1996 campaign contributions

Democratic Party South Carolina state senators
Democratic Party members of the South Carolina House of Representatives
South Carolina city council members
County council members in South Carolina
Businesspeople from South Carolina
People from Kershaw County, South Carolina
Clemson University alumni
Wingate University alumni
1935 births
2014 deaths
People from North Myrtle Beach, South Carolina
20th-century American businesspeople